Horvat's Choice (Horvatov izbor) is a 1985 Croatian film directed by Eduard Galić, starring Rade Šerbedžija, Mustafa Nadarević, Milena Dravić and Mira Furlan. It is based on Vučjak, a 1923 play by Miroslav Krleža.

The film's extended footage was used for a 15-part TV series titled Putovanje u Vučjak, broadcast by Radiotelevision Zagreb in 1986–87.

References

External links
 

1985 films
1980s Croatian-language films
Croatian films based on plays
Films based on works by Croatian writers
Croatian drama films
1985 drama films
Yugoslav drama films